Martina A. White (born July 7, 1988) is an American politician. A Republican, she is a member of the Pennsylvania House of Representatives for the 170th district, being first elected in 2015.

Career
White, a financial advisor and lifelong resident of Northeast Philadelphia, was first elected on March 24, 2015 in a special election to fill an open seat in the 170th District. She became the first new Republican elected in Philadelphia in 25 years.

The 170th District includes the neighborhoods of Bustleton, Millbrook, Parkwood and Somerton.

White currently serves as the Majority Caucus Secretary.  She is on the Rules Committee and the Committee on Committees.

The first member of her immediate family to graduate from college, White received her Bachelor of Science degree in Business Administration from Elizabethtown College.

On November 12, 2019, White was elected to be Chairwoman of the Philadelphia Republican City Committee. She held this position until June 2022.

Personal life
White resides in the Parkwood area of Northeast Philadelphia. White graduated in 2010 from Elizabethtown College and played field hockey.

Electoral history

References

External links
Representative White's official web site

Elizabethtown College alumni
Living people
Republican Party members of the Pennsylvania House of Representatives
People from Mechanicsburg, Pennsylvania
Politicians from Harrisburg, Pennsylvania
Women state legislators in Pennsylvania
1988 births
21st-century American politicians
21st-century American women politicians